Akin Vardar (born 2 April 1978) is a Turkish professional retired footballer. He played as a goalkeeper.

References

External links
 Guardian Stats Centre

1978 births
Living people
Turkish footballers
Süper Lig players
Association football goalkeepers
Aydınspor footballers
Sivasspor footballers
Karşıyaka S.K. footballers
People from Kuyucak